VTP may refer to:

Computing

 VLAN Trunking Protocol, a proprietary Layer 2 messaging protocol.
 Venturi Transport Protocol, a proprietary transport layer protocol.
 Virtual Terminal Protocol

Other

 Value of Total Plays, a term from the fruit machine industry.
 Virtual trading point